HMS Boreham was one of 93 ships of the  of inshore minesweepers.

Their names were all chosen from villages ending in -ham. The minesweeper was named after Boreham in Essex.

References
 

Ham-class minesweepers
Ships built in Lowestoft
1952 ships
Cold War minesweepers of the United Kingdom
Royal Navy ship names
Ham-class minesweepers of the Royal Malaysian Navy